Francisco Hernández Pineda (16 January 1924 – 24 January 2011) was a Mexican football midfielder.

Career
Hernández played for Mexico national team in the 1950 FIFA World Cup. He also played for Zacatepec and was a longtime executive and coach at Club América.

References

External links
FIFA profile

1924 births
2011 deaths
Mexico international footballers
Association football midfielders
Club Atlético Zacatepec players
1950 FIFA World Cup players
Footballers from the State of Mexico
People from Toluca
Mexican footballers